Jose Silverio "Evo" Rocchi Guzmán (born 16 July 1988) is a Mexican of Italian descent football goalkeeper who last played for Mons Calpe in the Gibraltar Premier Division.

Club career

Puebla FC
Rocchi began his professional career at the local club Puebla FC, for whom he debuted in the Liga de Ascenso Clausura 2006 at only 18 years. He played in the Segunda División Profesional for their youth division, Puebla de La Franja.

Rocchi joined Masnou in November 2006.

Vicenza Calcio
In July 2009, he was sold to Vicenza Calcio of Italy.

References

1988 births
Mexican expatriate footballers
Footballers from Puebla
Mons Calpe S.C. players
Club Puebla players
UDA Gramenet footballers
C.A. Cerro players
People from Puebla (city)
Expatriate footballers in Italy
Association football goalkeepers
Mexican people of Italian descent
Living people
Expatriate footballers in Uruguay
CD Masnou players
Mexican footballers